Rockfleet Broadcasting is a broadcasting company based in New York City. The company has three stations in its family.

A fourth station in Cadillac, Michigan (within the Traverse City market) is no longer under Rockfleet ownership. On May 10, 2007, it was announced that Rockfleet Broadcasting was planning to sell Fox affiliate WFQX-TV/WFUP to Cadillac Telecasting. The Federal Communications Commission (FCC) approved the sale in late-October. After this approval, Cadillac entered into a shared services agreement (SSA) with Heritage Broadcasting Group (owner of CBS affiliate WWTV). At that point, WFQX/WFUP began to be operated by WWTV.

Stations
WVII 7 (ABC) - Bangor, Maine
WJFW 12 (NBC) - Wausau / Rhinelander, Wisconsin
WFVX 22 (primary Fox / secondary MyNetworkTV) - Bangor, Maine

External links
WVII-TV/DT ABC 7 & WFVX-LP FOX Bangor
WJFW NBC 12

Television broadcasting companies of the United States
Companies based in New York City